Showtrial is a British television legal drama created by Ben Richards and starring Tracy Ifeachor and Céline Buckens. The five-part series commenced on BBC One in October 2021.

Synopsis 
Talitha Campbell, the arrogant daughter of a wealthy entrepreneur, is arrested following the disappearance of fellow student, Hannah Ellis, the hard-working daughter of a single mother. From Talitha's arrest to the jury's final verdict, Showtrial switches between both sides of the legal battle, as defence and prosecution fight for their version of what really happened to Hannah, and the truth about Talitha: was she falsely accused or is she a callous murderer?

Cast 
 Tracy Ifeachor as Cleo Roberts
 Céline Buckens as Talitha Campbell
 Kerr Logan as James Thornley
 Lolita Chakrabarti as Meera Harwood
 Sharon D. Clarke as Virginia Hoult
 Sinéad Keenan as Detective Inspector Paula Cassidy
 James Frain as Sir Damian Campbell
 Christopher Hatherall as DC Andy Lowell 
 Amy Morgan as Heidi McKinnon
 Elizabeth Rider as Dame Isobel Cavendish, The Hon Mrs Justice Cavendish 
 Alec Newman as Dr Stephen Vendler
 Joseph Payne as Dhillon Harwood
Rupert Holliday-Evans as Brian Reeves
Claire Lams as Andrea Ellis
Camilla Power as Cressida, Lady Campbell
Lu Corfield as Emma Hemmings
Amy Marston as Lydia Vendler
Abra Thompson as Hannah Ellis
Angus Castle-Doughty as Troy Manners
Mika Simmons as Amanda Wilkinson
Rebecca Grant as Nisha Baria

Episodes

Production 
BBC One commissioned Showtrial in 2019. Principal photography began in April 2021 in Bristol, including at the University of Bristol.

References

External links
 
 

2021 British television series debuts
2021 British television series endings
2020s British crime drama television series
2020s British legal television series
Courtroom drama television series
English-language television shows
Fictional murderers
Television series by World Productions
Television shows set in Bristol
Television series by ITV Studios
BBC crime drama television shows